Nuno Filipe Oliveira dos Santos (born 19 June 1980) is a Portuguese former professional footballer who played mainly as a forward but also as a full back (right or left).

Club career
Born in Viana do Castelo, Santos spent his early career in the third and fourth divisions, reaching the Segunda Liga in 2004 with Varzim SC. Four years later he was signed by another club in that tier, Azores' C.D. Santa Clara, starting in all league games during the season and scoring nine goals, including two braces.

In May 2010, after being again a starter with Santa Clara in the 2009–10 campaign, the 30-year-old Santos signed a two-year contract with Primeira Liga club F.C. Paços de Ferreira. He appeared in 14 matches in his first year, totalling 430 minutes of action and failing to find the net.

Santos retired in 2017 at the age of 37, after spells with C.D. Tondela and Académica de Coimbra.

References

External links

1980 births
Living people
People from Viana do Castelo
Sportspeople from Viana do Castelo District
Portuguese footballers
Association football defenders
Association football forwards
Association football utility players
Primeira Liga players
Liga Portugal 2 players
Segunda Divisão players
G.D. Serzedelo players
F.C. Oliveira do Hospital players
S.C.U. Torreense players
Académico de Viseu F.C. players
U.D. Oliveirense players
Varzim S.C. players
C.D. Santa Clara players
F.C. Paços de Ferreira players
C.D. Tondela players
Associação Académica de Coimbra – O.A.F. players